Amakali Combined School is a public school in Onyaanya, Oshikoto Region, Namibia. It is one of the top performing schools in Namibia, and Oshikoto Region in particular.

See also
List of schools in Namibia
Education in Namibia

References

Schools in Oshikoto Region